Jing County or Jingxian may refer to:

Jing County, Anhui (泾县), China
Jing County, Hebei (景县), China
Jingzhou Miao and Dong Autonomous County, formerly Jing County (靖县)
Jīngxiān, a class of Xian or immortals in Taoist lore.

See also
Jin County (disambiguation)
Jinxian County
Jinxiang (disambiguation)